No Signal is the second full-length album by Illinois indie rock band Park. It was released in 2001 on Lobster Records.

The final track "Untitled (Bonus Track)" is referred to as "AJS" during numerous live performances.

Track listing

Personnel
Ladd Mitchell - Vocals, lead guitar
Justin Valenti - Guitar
Miles Logan - Drums

References

Park (band) albums
2001 albums
Lobster Records albums